Tom Young is a Republican member of the Ohio House of Representatives representing the 37th district. He was elected in 2020 unopposed. Young first attempted to run for House District 42 in 2014, but could not gain enough support from the Montgomery County Republican party, losing the nomination to now Senator Niraj Antani

References

Living people
Republican Party members of the Ohio House of Representatives
21st-century American politicians
Year of birth missing (living people)